Peter Chambers (1878–1952)  was an English professional footballer  in the years prior to the First World War. He made over 160 appearances in the Football League for  Blackburn Rovers and Bristol City. He also played in the Southern League for both Bristol City and Swindon Town.

Career
Chambers was born in Workington in 1878 where he helped the local club Black Diamonds to win both the Cumberland League and Cup. After playing for Blackburn Rovers, Bedminster and Bristol City, he joined Swindon Town in July 1907 along with Freddie Fenton and Billy Jones.

After retiring Chambers was landlord of the Red Lion pub and died in Swindon in 1952.

References

1878 births
1952 deaths
Sportspeople from Swindon
English footballers
Association football wing halves
Black Diamonds F.C. players
Blackburn Rovers F.C. players
Bedminster F.C. players
Bristol City F.C. players
Swindon Town F.C. players
English Football League players
Southern Football League players